Bustaneh may refer to:
 Bustaneh, Hormozgan
 Bustaneh, Malekshahi, Ilam Province